Briary is a ghost town in Milam County, Texas, near Rosebud. It was named for Big Briary Creek, which was nearby. The town had several businesses, churches, and a schoolhouse (which can be still seen today) in the 1940s, but was dropped from maps by the next decade.

References

Ghost towns in Central Texas
Ghost towns in Milam County, Texas